Scotiellopsis is a genus of green algae in the family Scenedesmaceae.

References

External links

Sphaeropleales genera
Sphaeropleales